The following is a list of winners of the Golden Calf for best Television Drama at the NFF.

 2022 Rampvlucht
 2021 Singleplay Onze Straat: May
 2021 Dramaseries: Mocro Maffia
 2020 Wouter Bouvijn and Anke Blondé - Red Light 
 2019 Rob Lücker - Zeven Kleine Criminelen
 2018 Tim Oliehoek - Het geheime dagboek van Hendrik Groen
 2017 Tim Oliehoek - De Zaak Menten
 2016 Giancarlo Sánchez - One Night Stand IX - Horizon
 2015 Mees Peijnenburg - One Night Stand X - Geen koningen in ons bloed
 2014 Dana Nechushtan - Hollands Hoop
 2013 Boris Paval Conen - Exit
 2012 Frank Ketelaar, Dana Nechushtan & Arno Dierickx - Overspel
 2011 Rolf van Eijk - Vast
 2010 Thomas Korthals Altes - Finnemans
 2009 Martijn Maria Smits - Anvers
 2008 Jorien van Nes - Den Helder
 2007 Peter de Baan - De Prins en het Meisje
 2006 Frank Ketelaar - Escort
 2005 Peter de Baan - De Kroon
 2004 Nicole van Kilsdonk - Deining
 2003 more than 60 minutes: Theo van Gogh - Najib en Julia 
 2003 less than 60 minutes: Colette Bothof - Dwaalgast
 2002 Boris Paval Conen - De 9 dagen van de gier
 2001 Willem van de Sande Bakhuyzen - Familie
 2000 Willem van de Sande Bakhuyzen - Bij ons in de Jordaan
 1999 Gerrard Verhage - Dichter op de Zeedijk
 1998 Arno Dierickx - De zeven deugden: Maria op zolder
 1997 Theo van Gogh - In het belang van de staat
 1996 Pieter Kramer - 30 Minuten: Geboren in een verkeerd lichaam
 1995 Theu Boermans - De partizanen
 1994 Paula van der Oest - Coma 
 1993 Francken & Treurniet & Planting & v. Duren - Pleidooi

Sources
 Golden Calf Award at Dutch Wikipedia
 Official Golden Calf Website (Dutch)

Best TV Drama